Pollo Campero is a fast-food restaurant chain, located in Guatemala, Honduras, El Salvador, Ecuador, Nicaragua, Mexico, Spain, Bahrain,  Belize, Haiti, Montserrat, the British Virgin Islands, Africa, Brazil, Canada, and Italy. The chain has nearly 400 locations, including more than 70 in the United States.

Corporate affairs and history

Pollo Campero International headquarters are located in Dallas, Texas. The headquarters was previously in a  area in Lincoln Center, but moved in 2016.

Pollo Campero has been popular with the Guatemalan and Salvadoran diaspora, who see it as a nostalgic taste from home. This led to a tradition of relatives bringing boxes of the restaurant's chicken to the United States on international flights, with some even reselling the chicken. Issues with the smell led to the company developing an insulated bag to make it easier to transport for air passengers and better contain odors. While the chain opened branches in the United States starting in 2002, which became quite popular and had eight-hour lines upon opening, many customers felt that the chicken and taste was not the same, and chicken continues to be brought by passengers to the United States. The chain also announced plans to expand to Spain, Poland and Portugal in that year.

In 2007 the company opened a restaurant in Shanghai, its first in China.

See also
 List of chicken restaurants
 Pollo Brujo

References

External links

 
  
  

Food and drink companies of Guatemala
Fast-food chains of the United States
Fast-food poultry restaurants
Guatemalan brands
Restaurants established in 1971
Guatemalan companies established in 1971
Food and drink companies established in 1971
1971 establishments in Guatemala